Isabel Cristina Ceballos Rojas (born February 3, 1979) is an Olympic breaststroke swimmer from Colombia. She swam for Colombia at the 1996 and 2000 Olympics. 

At the 2000 Olympics, she set Colombian records in the 100 and 200 breaststroke (1:11.90 and  2:34.09).

She swam for Colombia at the:
2000 Olympics
1999 Pan American Games
1998 World Championships
1998 Central American & Caribbean Games
1996 Olympics
1993 Central American & Caribbean Games

References

1979 births
Living people
Female breaststroke swimmers
Colombian female swimmers
Olympic swimmers of Colombia
Swimmers at the 1995 Pan American Games
Swimmers at the 1996 Summer Olympics
Swimmers at the 1999 Pan American Games
Swimmers at the 2000 Summer Olympics
Place of birth missing (living people)
Pan American Games competitors for Colombia
20th-century Colombian women
21st-century Colombian women